A constitutional referendum was held in Ecuador on 28 September 2008 to ratify or reject the constitution drafted by the Ecuadorian Constituent Assembly elected in 2007. The new constitution was approved by 69% of voters.

Following its approval, early elections were held in April 2009.

Background
President Rafael Correa had initially stated he would resign if the constitution were rejected, but later stated he would finish his term. A poll from May 2008 saw 41% to 31% in favour of the constitution draft. Provisions include the right to healthcare, food, social security, and education as well as an emphasis on Latin American integration. The more controversial proposals include allowing a second four-year term for the president and legalising civil unions.

Conduct
The EU sent an election observation team.

Results

References

Constitutional referendum
2008 referendums
Referendums in Ecuador
Constitutional referendums in Ecuador